Davani is a primarily Persian-language surname, although it is also found in Papua New Guinea. Notable people with the surname include:

 Alex Davani (born 1985), Papua New Guinean footballer
 Ali Davani (1929–2007), Iranian scholar
 Catherine Davani (1960–2016), Papua New Guinean judge
 Jalaladdin Davani (1462–1502), Iranian scholar
 Pirouz Davani, Iranian leftist activist
 Reggie Davani (born 1980), Papua New Guinean footballer
 Davani Winklaar (born 2006)

Persian-language surnames